The Walter Winchell File is a television crime drama series that initially aired from 1957 to 1958, dramatizing cases from the New York City Police Department that were covered in the New York Daily Mirror. The series featured columnist and announcer Walter Winchell, John Larch, George Cisar, Robert Anderson, Robert Brubaker, Dolores Donlon, and Gene Barry, a year before he was cast in the lead of NBC's Bat Masterson.

Thirty-nine episodes were produced; the first twenty-six aired on ABC during the 1957–1958 season (sponsored by Revlon), and the final thirteen were seen in syndication in 1959.

Other notable guest stars

Dan Blocker
Charles Bronson
Mike Connors
James Drury
Bill Erwin
Brian G. Hutton
Jack Klugman
Diane Ladd
Martin Landau
John Larch
Tom Laughlin
Ruta Lee
Gavin MacLeod
Strother Martin
Ed Nelson
Marion Ross
Harry Dean Stanton
Robert Vaughn
Robert J. Wilke

Selected Episodes

 The Steep Hill, directed by Jacques Tourneur (1957) (25 mn)
 House on Biscayne Bay, directed by Jacques Tourneur (1958) (25 mn)
 The Stopover, directed by Jacques Tourneur (1958) (25 mn)

References

External links 
The Walter Winchell File at CVTA with episode list
 

1957 American television series debuts
1959 American television series endings
American Broadcasting Company original programming
1950s American crime drama television series
Black-and-white American television shows
First-run syndicated television programs in the United States
Television series by CBS Studios
Television series by Desilu Productions